Eben Comins (May 19, 1875 – April 13, 1949) was an American painter. His work was part of the painting event in the art competition at the 1932 Summer Olympics.

References

1875 births
1949 deaths
20th-century American painters
American male painters
Olympic competitors in art competitions
People from Boston
20th-century American male artists